is a private university in Suita, Osaka, Japan, established in 2003.

External links
 Official website 

Educational institutions established in 2003
Private universities and colleges in Japan
Universities and colleges in Osaka Prefecture
2003 establishments in Japan